Abdirahman Haji Aden Ibbi also known as Prof.  Abdirahman Haji Aden alone is a Somali politician. He served as the Deputy Prime Minister of Somalia, Minister of Information and is currently a member of the federal parliament of Somalia.

History 
Abdirahman Hajji Aden Ibbi was the former deputy Prime Minister under the administration of the former President, Sheikh Sharif and his Prime Minister Omar Abdirashid Ali Sharmarke. He also served as Minister of Information.

References 

Date of birth missing (living people)
Living people
Somalian politicians
Year of birth missing (living people)